Touch Me is a 1997 drama-romance film directed by H. Gordon Boos. It stars Amanda Peet, Michael Vartan, Kari Wuhrer and Peter Facinelli.

Cast
 Amanda Peet as Bridgette
 Michael Vartan as Adam
 Peter Facinelli as Bail
 Kari Wuhrer as Margot
 Greg Louganis as David
 Erica Gimpel as Kareen
 Jamie Harris as Link
 Stephen Macht as Robert
 Ann Turkel as Linda
 Tim Quill as Michael
 Jenette Goldstein as Gabrielle
 Jane Lynch as Counselor
 Leslie Bibb as Fawn

Reception
The film received average reviews from critics. It has a 43% rating on Rotten Tomatoes.

Release
The film was released on September 5, 1997 at the Toronto International Film Festival.

References

External links

1997 films
1990s English-language films
American romantic drama films
1990s American films